Loxostege kingi is a moth in the family Crambidae. It was described by Eugene G. Munroe in 1976. It is found in North America, where it has been recorded from Nevada and California.

References

Moths described in 1976
Pyraustinae